Yo mimo soy is a 2014 Peruvian biographical comedy-drama film written and directed by Héctor Marreros. It is based on the autobiographical book by Richard Chávez Vargas, a police non-commissioned officer who alternates his performance in the Emergency Squad with his characterization of the trampoline clown in various activities.

Synopsis 
The life of a child from Celendino who dreamed of being a policeman and a clown. Film based on the true story of the Peruvian policeman Richard Chávez Vargas, who in addition to being a member of the police force works as a clown or mime.

Cast 

 Alex Johanson
 Arturo Alcántara
 Sonia Medrano
 Yajdel Vásquez
 Juan Carlos Morales

Release 
He had a special function on March 27, 2014, in Cajamarca, Peru. It had a limited release in the rest of Peru on August 27, 2015.

Reception 
It managed to attract 191 viewers in its limited theatrical release.

References 

2014 films
2014 comedy-drama films
Peruvian biographical films
Peruvian comedy-drama films
2010s Spanish-language films
2010s Peruvian films
Films set in Peru
Films shot in Peru
Films about children
Films based on autobiographical novels